Ghulam Dastagir Qureshi (1918 – 12 January 1994) was an Indian cricketer. He played 17 first-class matches for Hyderabad between 1936 and 1955.

See also
 List of Hyderabad cricketers

References

External links
 

1918 births
1994 deaths
Indian cricketers
Hyderabad cricketers
Cricketers from Hyderabad, India